Spipipockia is a genus of land snails with an operculum, terrestrial troglobiont gastropod molluscs in the family Cochliopidae.

Diversity
Spiripockia currently includes two species:
Spiripockia punctata Simone, 2012
Spiripockia umbraticola Simone & Salvador, 2021

Ecology 
Snails in the genus Spiripockia are troglobiont, which means they are small cave-dwelling animals that are adapted to dark environments.

References 

Cochliopidae
Molluscs of Brazil
Endemic fauna of Brazil